Kuthar, formerly Krishangarh, is located in the Solan district of Himachal Pradesh. Krishangarh (Kuthar) is situated on the MDR-75 i.e. Shalaghat-Arki-Kunihar-Kuthar-Patta-Brotiwala (previously known as State Highway-9) adjoining Sabathu, Kasauli area. Krishangarh is an administrative division of Solan district having sub-tehsil status.

History 
Kuthar was a princely state of the British Raj, located in modern-day Himachal Pradesh. It was one of the several states of the Punjab States Agency.

The state of Kuthar was founded in the 17th century. It was occupied by Nepali forces during drive of Himalayas from 1803 to 1815.

Rulers
The rulers bore the title of rana.

 1803 - Gopal Singh
 1815 - 1858 Bhup Singh
 1858 - 1896 Jai Chand
 1896 - 1930 Jagjit Chand
 1930 - 15 August 1947 Krishna Chand (born 1905)

Gallery

See also

 http://www.worldstatesmen.org/India_princes_K-W.html
 https://masalamug.com/kuthar-hideout-in-himachal/

References

http://rulers.org/indstat2.html

17th-century establishments in India
Agencies of British India
Princely states of Himachal Pradesh
Historical Indian regions
Princely states of India